Clarence White (1901 – death unknown), nicknamed "Red", was an American Negro league pitcher from 1928 to 1940.

A native of Tennessee, White made his Negro leagues debut in 1928 with the Memphis Red Sox. He went on to play for the Nashville Elite Giants, Louisville Black Caps, Louisville White Sox, and Montgomery Grey Sox through 1932, and the Cleveland Bears in 1940.

References

External links
 and Baseball-Reference Black Baseball stats and Seamheads

1901 births
Date of birth missing
Year of death missing
Place of birth missing
Place of death missing
Cleveland Bears players
Louisville Black Caps players
Louisville White Sox players
Memphis Red Sox players
Montgomery Grey Sox players
Nashville Elite Giants players
Baseball pitchers